The province of Kurdistan (also known as Ardalan) was a western province of Safavid Iran, whose size varied throughout its existence due to political and military developments.

The office of vali (viceroy) of Kurdistan was generally held by the Ardalan dynasty, the leading power amongst the Kurdish confederations.

Administration 
Kurdistan was one of the five velayats of Safavid Iran, being ruled by a vali (viceroy), who was nearly an independent governor. The valis generally belonged to prominent local families, and were officially chosen by the shah as a compromise of regional autonomy. Nevertheless, they ruled in a hereditary manner. In rare occasions a vali was appointed to a velayat he had no connection to. This could possibly cause issues, such as in the 1680s Kurdistan, where a non-Kurdish vali chosen by Shah Soleyman was chased out by the locals. The position of vali of Kurdistan was held by the Ardalan dynasty, the leading power amongst the Kurdish confederations. Available records suggest that before the 17th-century, the Safavids rarely intervened in the succession of the Ardalan governors. However, they did occasionally support one claimant against another.

History

16th century 
In 1508, the local rulers of Kurdistan acknowledged the suzerainty of the Safavids. Shah Tahmasp I made numerous other attempts to inregrate the Kurds into his kingdom. The offspring of the Kurdish emirs were welcomed into the royal court and educated alongside the Safavid princes. They were anticipated to develop into devoted servants of the shah, being taught a variety of subjects, such as military expertise. Sharafkhan Bidlisi, who was raised at Tahmasp's court, described his upbringing there;

The modern historian Akihiko Yamaguchi considers Tahmasp's program to be "nothing less than a hostage policy", but also states that Sharafkhan Bidlisi's description demonstrates that Tahmasp planned to increase their loyalty to him, and that it significantly strengthened the court's relationship with the local lords. Another important aspect of Tahmasp's Kurdish policy was the enrollment of young members of Kurdish ruling families into the qurchi (royal guards). A Kurd who had been raised in the court or served as a qurchi was occasionally elevated to become the head of his own tribe. These tribal leaders were anticipated to keep preserve their personal ties with the shah and the royal court due to their court schooling or employment as a qurchi. Nevertheless, during Tahmasp's rule the Kurds were overlooked in the administration. Prominent positions in the political and military spheres were predominantly allocated to members of the Qizilbash; few Kurdish individuals acquired a rank high enough to be recognized in historical Safavid records and alike. Tahmasp's goal of ensuring the Kurds loyalty was mainly successful, since only a few Kurdish emirs defected to the Ottoman Empire after the Peace of Amasya, which forbid the Safavids and Ottomans from interfering in each others internal affairs.

Following the death of Tahmasp in 1576, a power struggle amongst the Qizilbash tribes ensured, shortly followed by a Ottoman invasion, which impelled the Kurdish tribes under Safavid rule to once again switch back and forth between them and the Ottomans. The conflict was resolved through the Treaty of Constantinople in 1590, which led to the relinquishment of the western portion of Iran to the Ottomans. This also included the majority of Kurdistan, which would remain in Ottoman hands for over ten years. From 1577 onwards, Sonqor and Dinavar came under direct Safavid control, and continued to do so even after Zanganeh tribe were made its hereditary governors in 1639.

Kurdistan was amongst the areas affected by the reforms of Shah Abbas I. From now on, as long as the Kurdish emirs remained faithful to Safavids, their hereditary titles would be acknowledged by the shah. This practice would last until the collapse of the Safavid kingdom. Kurdish tribal leaders were also given governor posts in provinces outside Kurdistan, particularly on the eastern and southern perimeter of Iran.

17th century 
The size of Kurdistan and autonomy of the Ardalan valis decreased after the Iranian–Ottoman Treaty of Zohab in 1639. The western half of Kurdistan was ceded to the Ottomans, which included Shahrezur, Qaradagh, Qezelja, Sarutchek, Kirkuk, Rawandez, Emayideh, Koy, Harir and the western portion of Avraman. The extent of Kurdistan was thus now restricted to that of Sanandaj, Marivan, eastern Avraman, Baneh, Saqqeh, Javanrud, and some of the Jaf confederacy. This also led to the downfall of the Kurdish principalities of Shahrezur and Dinavar. The shah now had the authority to freely appoint and dismiss the vali, and Kurdish problems were from now on settled by appealing to Isfahan.

18th century 
Near the collapse of the Safavid state, Kurdistan was composed of the following administrative jurisdictions (also referred to as subordinate governorships): Avraman, Baneh, Bakhtiyari, Javanrud, Khorkhoreh, and Lorestan-e Feyli.

The Safavid era played a substantial role in the integration of Iranian Kurdistan into the political structure of Iran. The Kurdish local elites were strongly aware of their affiliation with Iran, which helped shape Iran's western border.

List of governors 
This is a list of the known figures who governed Kurdistan or parts of it. Beglerbeg, hakem and vali were all administrative titles designating the governor.

References

Sources 
 
 
 
 
 
 

Kurdistan
16th century in Iran
17th century in Iran
18th century in Iran
Kurdistan
History of Kurdistan Province